Joseph S. Cardone (born October 19, 1946 in Pasadena, California) is an American film director, producer and writer. He is probably best known for writing and directing The Slayer, Shadowzone and The Forsaken as well as being the writer for The Covenant.

Selected filmography

Writer
 The Stepfather (2009)
 Prom Night (2008)
 The Covenant (2006)
 The Marksman (2005)
 Sniper 3 (2004)
 Mummy an' The Armadillo (2004)
 Alien Hunter (2003)
 True Blue (2001)
 The Forsaken (2001)
 Outside Ozona (1998)
 Exit in Red (1996)
 Black Day Blue Night (1995)
 Shadowhunter (1993)
 A Climate for Killing (1991)
 Crash and Burn (1990)
 Shadowzone (1990)
 Thunder Alley (1985)
 The Slayer (1982)

Producer
 Prom Night (2008)
 Wicked Little Things (2006)
 The Covenant (2006)
 8mm 2 (2005)
 The Marksman (2005)
 Vampires: The Turning (2005)
 Sniper 3 (2004)
 Alien Hunter (2003)
 Sniper 2 (2002)
 Exit in Red (1996)
 The Slayer (1982)

Director
 Wicked Little Things (2006)
 8mm 2 (2005)
 Mummy an' the Armadillo (2004)
 True Blue (2001)
 The Forsaken (2001)
 Outside Ozona (1998)
 Black Day Blue Night (1995)
 Shadowhunter (1993)
 A Climate for Killing (1991)
 Shadowzone (1990)
 Thunder Alley (1985)
 The Slayer (1982)

External links
 
 2007 Audio Interview on the Your Video Store Shelf Podcast

1946 births
Living people
Film directors from California
Film producers from California
Male screenwriters
Writers from Pasadena, California